Xestia liquidaria is a species of cutworm or dart moth in the family Noctuidae. It is found in Europe and Northern Asia (excluding China) and North America.

The MONA or Hodges number for Xestia liquidaria is 10934.

References

Further reading

 
 
 

Xestia
Articles created by Qbugbot
Moths described in 1848